Substrata 2, also written as Substrata², is a double album by ambient musician Biosphere which was released on 6 June 2001.

The first disc is a remastered version of Substrata, and the second disc is a soundtrack for Dziga Vertov's 1929 film Man with a Movie Camera, commissioned by the Tromsø International Film Festival in 1996, plus two bonus tracks from the Japanese version of Substrata (the last two tracks).

The cover image is a photograph of Taormina railway station, Sicily.

Track listing

Disc one
 "As the Sun Kissed the Horizon" – 1:47
 "Poa Alpina" – 4:11
 "Chukhung" – 7:34
 "The Things I Tell You" – 6:28
 "Times When I Know You'll Be Sad" – 3:44
 "Hyperborea" – 5:45
 "Kobresia" – 7:12
 "Antennaria" – 5:04
 "Uva-Ursi" – 3:01
 "Sphere of No-Form" – 5:47
 "Silene" – 7:53

Disc two
 "Prologue" – 0:19
 "The Silent Orchestra" – 7:52
 "City Wakes Up" – 5:58
 "Freeze-Frames" – 6:46
 "Manicure" – 4:43
 "The Club" – 1:57
 "Ballerina" – 7:50
 "The Eye of the Cyclone" – 7:22
 "Endurium" – 10:47

References

2001 albums
Biosphere (musician) albums
Touch Music albums